Yaşar Uğur Uluocak (1962 – 2 July 2003) was a Turkish outdoorsman, mountaineer, photographer, and editor.

Born in 1962 in Ankara, Turkey, Uğur attended Saint Joseph High School in Istanbul, and graduated in Mechanical Engineering from Istanbul Technical University.

Uğur started mountain climbing in 1984 with the mountaineering club at Istanbul Technical University (ITUDAK). Uğur was a complete sportsman. He competed four years in rowing, ranking in first place. He was a middle and long distance runner for eight years, and a scuba diver and cyclist for the last two years. As a globally known  mountaineer, he trained many young sportsmen both in theoretical and practical ways.

From 1999 on, Uğur worked as a photographer, expedition coordinator, and editor for the Turkish nature and outdoor sports magazine Atlas. He not only wrote about his mountaineering adventures but also on mountaineering ethics and history with his friend Ahmet Köksal.

Uğur was an influential figure in the Turkish mountaineering community, with a very strong and dedicated personality and an extremely high intellectual capacity. He was fluent in five languages.

Professionally, he was a lecturer at the Marmara University in Istanbul and was also an active member of the Communist Party of Turkey for over 20 years.

Uğur Uluocak died on 2 July 2003 while on a descent in the Alarcha Mountain in Kyrgyzstan when a rock broke off and he took a  fall. His body was recovered by his teammates Haldun Ülkenli and Alper Işın Duran and brought to his homeland for burial. Uğur is the second Turkish mountaineer after Ali Kepenek to have died in a foreign country while climbing a mountain.

Achievements
 Direktaş, north face (solo, in 2 hours) and northeast dihedral, Ala Mountains (Turkey)
 Mt. Büyük Demirkazık, west face (solo) and north face, Ala Mountains (Turkey)
 Mt. Küçük Demirkazık, south face (first ascent), Ala Mountains (Turkey)
 Çağalın Başı, northwest face (first ascent), Ala Mountains (Turkey)
 Ağrı (Mount Ararat) (5,137 m), north glacier in summer and winter
 Mount Elbrus (5,642 m) in Caucassus
 Peak Vorobiyov (5,685 m), Peak Chetyriokh (Peak of Fours) (6,299 m), Peak Korzhenevskaya (7,105 m), Peak Communism (7,495 m) in Pamir Mountains
 Razdelnaya (6,248 m), Khan Tengri (7,010 m), Lenin Peak (7,134 m) in Kyrgyzstan.
 K-2 (8,611 m), two attempts in 1998 and 1999
 1999 Shisha Pangma (8,013 m) in People's Republic of China
 1999 Cho Oyu (8,201 m) in Nepal, alpine solo
 2000 Annapurna attempt
 2002 Mt. Reşko (4,135 m), northwest/north face, Cilo Mountains (Turkey)

References
 Biography in Turkish
 News about his last ascent in the newspaper Sabah in Turkish
  News about his last ascent in the newspaper Radikal in Turkish

1962 births
2003 deaths
Istanbul Technical University alumni
Mountaineering deaths
Sport deaths in Kyrgyzstan
St. Joseph High School Istanbul alumni
Turkish atheism activists
Turkish communists
Turkish former Muslims
Turkish male rowers
Turkish mountain climbers
Turkish photographers